"Gotta Leave" is a song by 702, released as the third and final single from their second studio album, 702. The song was written and produced by Missy Elliott, Eric Seats, and Rapture Stewart, who were also the writers and producers for their first single "Where My Girls At?". "Gotta Leave", an R&B groove containing electronic sounds, had received minor success, only able to reach #58 on the Billboard R&B charts.

Background
"Gotta Leave" marks the third single released from 702's self-titled sophomore album and in December 1999 MTV reported that 702 had gone back in the studio with Missy Elliott to record a remix version of the song which served as the single version for the song

Music video 
The music video for "Gotta Leave" was shot in Los Angeles California in February 2000 and it was directed by Darren Grant. The video premiered on BET the week ending March 19, 2000. The concept of the video is about the girls of 702 being fed up with the lying cheating men in their lives. The video begins with the girls in a house doing various activities while wearing all black outfits. Irish is looking for items in the closet, Meelah is in the bathroom combing her hair in the mirror and Lemisha is shown walking towards the  garage. The next scene show the girls wearing white outfits singing. The next various scenes show the girls sitting around the table talking and playing Dominoes and individually lounging around the house alone. Dressed in all black the women eventually leave the house and drive off. After a while the women are shown singing as they are driving in the middle of no where until they reach their destination. Once they reach their destination they get out of the car and open up the trunk of the car. After they open up the trunk it is revealed that they have kidnapped a guy who is possibly dating one of the girls. As they are singing the chorus of the song the women taunt the frightened man. They close the trunk of the car and drive off and the final scene of the video reverts to the previous scene showing  the girls sitting around the table playing dominoes.

Track listings

Charts

Weekly charts

References 

2000 singles
702 (group) songs
Songs written by Missy Elliott
1999 songs
Motown singles
American pop songs